Gene Epley (December 18, 1942 – November 21, 2010) was an American football coach.  He served as the head football coach at Shippensburg University of Pennsylvania from 1972 to 1975 and at Marietta College in Marietta, Ohio from 1991 to 2002, compiling a career college football coaching record of 63–95–3.

References

External links
 

1942 births
2010 deaths
Army Black Knights football coaches
IUP Crimson Hawks football players
Marietta Pioneers football coaches
Shippensburg Red Raiders football coaches
Utah State Aggies football coaches
Utah Utes football coaches
Virginia Cavaliers football coaches
William & Mary Tribe football coaches
High school football coaches in Pennsylvania
Utah State University alumni
People from Beaver County, Pennsylvania
Coaches of American football from Pennsylvania
Players of American football from Pennsylvania